The non-aggression principle (NAP), also called the non-aggression axiom, is a concept in which aggression, defined as initiating or threatening any forceful interference (violating or breaching conduct) against an individual, their property, or promises (contracts) for which the aggressor is liable and in which the individual is a counterparty, is inherently wrong. There is no single or universal interpretation or definition of the NAP, with different definitions varying in regards to how to treat intellectual property, force, abortion, and other topics.

The non-aggression principle is considered by some to be an essential idea in libertarianism, anarcho-capitalism or minarchism.

Justifications 

The principle has been derived by various philosophical approaches, including:
 Argumentation ethics: some modern right-libertarian thinkers ground the non-aggression principle by an appeal to the necessary praxeological presuppositions of any ethical discourse, an argument pioneered by anarcho-capitalist scholar Hans Hermann Hoppe. They claim that the act of arguing for the initiation of aggression, as defined by the non-aggression principle, is contradictory. Among its advocates are Stephan Kinsella and Murray Rothbard.
 Consequentialism: some advocates base the non-aggression principle on rule utilitarianism or rule egoism. These approaches hold that though violations of the non-aggression principle cannot be claimed to be objectively immoral, adherence to it almost always leads to the best possible results, and so it should be accepted as a moral rule. These scholars include David D. Friedman, Ludwig von Mises, and Friedrich Hayek.
 Objectivism: Ayn Rand rejected natural or inborn rights theories as well as supernatural claims and instead proposed a philosophy based on "observable reality" along with a corresponding ethics based on the "factual requirements" of human life in a social context. She stressed that the political principle of non-aggression is not a primary and that it only has validity as a consequence of a more fundamental philosophy. For this reason, many of her conclusions differ from others who hold the NAP as an axiom or arrived at it differently. She proposed that man survives by identifying and using concepts in his rational mind since "no sensations, percepts, urges or instincts can do it; only a mind can". She wrote, "since reason is man's basic means of survival, that which is proper to the life of a rational being is the good; that which negates, opposes or destroys it [i.e. initiatory force or fraud] is the evil."
 Estoppel: Stephan Kinsella believes that the legal concept of estoppel implies and justifies the non-aggression principle.

Definitional issues

Abortion 

Both libertarian supporters and opponents of abortion rights justify their position on NAP grounds. One question to determine whether or not abortion is consistent with the NAP is at what stage of development a fertilized human egg cell can be considered a human being with the status and rights attributed to personhood. Some supporters of the NAP argue this occurs at the moment of conception while others argue that since the fetus lacks sentience until a certain stage of development, it does not qualify as a human being and may be considered property of the mother. On the other hand, opponents of abortion state that sentience is not a qualifying factor. They refer to the animal rights discussion and point out the argument from marginal cases that concludes the NAP also applies to non-sentient (i.e. mentally handicapped) humans.

Another question is whether an unwelcome fetus should be considered to be an unauthorized trespasser in its mother's body. The non-aggression principle does not protect trespassers from the owners of the property on which they are trespassing.

Objectivist philosopher Leonard Peikoff has argued that a fetus has no right to life inside the womb because it is not an "independently existing, biologically formed organism, let alone a person". Pro-choice libertarian Murray Rothbard held the same stance, maintaining that abortion is justified at any time during pregnancy if the fetus is no longer welcome inside its mother. Similarly, other pro-choice supporters base their argument on criminal trespass. In that case, they claim that the NAP is not violated when the fetus is forcibly removed, with deadly force if need be, from the mother's body, just as the NAP is not violated when an owner removes from the owner's property an unwanted visitor who is not willing to leave voluntarily. Libertarian theorist Walter Block follows this line of argument with his theory of evictionism, but he makes a distinction between evicting the fetus prematurely so that it dies and actively killing it. On the other hand, the theory of departurism permits only the non-lethal eviction of the trespassing fetus during a normal pregnancy.

Anti-abortion libertarians such as Libertarians for Life argue that because the parents were actively involved in creating a new human life and that life has not consented to his or her own existence, that life is in the womb by necessity and no parasitism or trespassing in the form of legal necessity is involved. They state that as the parents are responsible for that life's position, the NAP would be violated when that life is killed with abortive techniques.

Intellectual property rights 

The NAP has been defined as applicable to any unauthorized actions towards a person's physical property. Supporters of the NAP disagree on whether it should apply to intellectual property rights as well as physical property rights. Some argue that because intellectual concepts are non-rivalrous, intellectual property rights are unnecessary while others argue that intellectual property rights are as valid and important as physical ones.

Force and interventions 
Although the NAP is meant to guarantee an individual's sovereignty, libertarians greatly differ on the conditions under which the NAP applies. Especially unsolicited intervention by others, either to prevent society from being harmed by the individual's actions or to prevent an incompetent individual from being harmed by his own actions or inactions, is an important issue. The debate centers on topics such as the age of consent for children, intervention counseling (i.e. for addicted persons, or in case of domestic violence), involuntary commitment and involuntary treatment with regards to mental illness, medical assistance (i.e. prolonged life support vs euthanasia in general and for the senile or comatose in particular), human organ trade, state paternalism (including economic intervention) and foreign intervention by states. Other discussion topics on whether intervention is in line with the NAP include nuclear weapons proliferation, human trafficking and immigration.

Randian author Ronald Merill states that use of force is subjective, saying: "There's no objective basis for controlling the use of force. Your belief that you're using force to protect yourself is just an opinion; what if it is my opinion that you are violating my rights?"

States 
Some libertarians justify the existence of a minimal state on the grounds that anarcho-capitalism implies that the non-aggression principle is optional because the enforcement of laws is open to competition. They claim competing law enforcement would always result in war and the rule of the most powerful.

Anarcho-capitalists usually respond to this argument that this presumed outcome of what they call "coercive competition" (e.g. private military companies or private defense agencies that enforce local law) is not likely because of the very high cost, in lives and economically, of war. They claim that war drains those involved and leaves non-combatant parties as the most powerful, economically and militarily, ready to take over. Therefore, anarcho-capitalists claim that in practice, and in more advanced societies with large institutions that have a responsibility to protect their vested interests, disputes are most likely to be settled peacefully. Anarcho-capitalists also point out that a state monopoly of law enforcement does not necessarily make NAP present throughout society as corruption and corporatism, as well as lobby group clientelism in democracies, favor only certain people or organizations. Anarcho-capitalists aligned with the Rothbardian philosophy generally contend that the state violates the non-aggression principle by its very nature because, it is argued, governments necessarily use force against those who have not stolen private property, vandalized private property, assaulted anyone, or committed fraud.

Taxation 
Some proponents of the NAP see taxes as a violation of NAP, while critics of the NAP argue that because of the free-rider problem in case security is a public good, enough funds would not be obtainable by voluntary means to protect individuals from aggression of a greater severity. The latter therefore accept taxation, and consequently a breach of NAP with regard to any free-riders, as long as no more is levied than is necessary to optimise protection of individuals against aggression. Geolibertarians, who following the classical economists and Georgists adhere to the Lockean labor theory of property, argue that land value taxation is fully compatible with the NAP.

Anarcho-capitalists argue that the protection of individuals against aggression is self-sustaining like any other valuable service, and that it can be supplied without coercion by the free market much more effectively and efficiently than by a government monopoly. Their approach, based on proportionality in justice and damage compensation, argues that full restitution is compatible with both retributivism and a utilitarian degree of deterrence while consistently maintaining NAP in a society. They extend their argument to all public goods and services traditionally funded through taxation, like security offered by dikes.

Support and criticism 

Supporters of the NAP often appeal to it in order to argue for the immorality of theft, vandalism, sexual assault, assault, and fraud. Compared to nonviolence, the non-aggression principle does not preclude violence used in self-defense or defense of others. Many supporters argue that NAP opposes such policies as victimless crime laws, taxation, and military drafts. NAP is the foundation of libertarian philosophy.

NAP faces two kinds of criticism: the first holds that the principle is immoral, and the second argues that it is impossible to apply consistently in practice; respectively, consequentialist or deontological criticisms, and inconsistency criticisms. Libertarian academic philosophers have noted the implausible results consistently applying the principle yields: for example, Professor Matt Zwolinski notes that, because pollution necessarily violates the NAP by encroaching (even if slightly) on other people's property, consistently applying the NAP would prohibit driving, starting a fire, and other activities necessary to the maintenance of industrial society.

The NAP also faces definitional issues regarding what is understood as forceful interference and property, and under which conditions does it apply. The NAP has been criticized as circular reasoning and a rhetorical obfuscation of the coercive nature of right-libertarian property law enforcement because the principle redefines aggression in their own terms.

Moral criticism

Positive rights 
Critics argue that the non-aggression principle is not ethical because it opposes the initiation of force even when they would consider the results of such initiation to be morally superior to the alternatives that they have identified. In arguing against the NAP, philosopher Matt Zwolinski has proposed the following scenario: "Suppose that by imposing a very, very small tax on billionaires, I could provide life-saving vaccination for tens of thousands of desperately poor children. Even if we grant that taxation is aggression, and that aggression is generally wrong, is it really so obvious that the relatively minor aggression involved in these examples is wrong, given the tremendous benefit it produces?"

Incompatibility with driving and other civilizational necessities 
Zwolinski also notes that the NAP is incompatible with any practice that produces any pollution, because pollution encroaches on the property rights of others. Therefore, the NAP prohibits both driving and starting fires. Citing David D. Friedman, Zwolinski notes that the NAP is unable to place a sensible limitation on risk-creating behavior, arguing:

Innocent people problem 
Some critics use the example of the trolley problem to invalidate NAP. In case of the runaway trolley, headed for five victims tied to the track, NAP does not allow a trolley passenger to flip the switch that diverts the trolley to a different track if there is a person tied to that track. That person would have been unharmed if nothing was done, therefore by flipping the switch NAP is violated. Another example often cited by critics is human shields.

Some supporters argue that no one initiates force if their only option for self-defense is to use force against a greater number of people as long as they were not responsible for being in the position they are in. Murray Rothbard's and Walter Block's formulations of NAP avoid these objections by either specifying that the NAP applies only to a civilized context (and not "lifeboat situations") or that it applies only to legal rights (as opposed to general morality). Thus a starving man may, in consonance with general morality, break into a hunting cabin and steal food, but nevertheless he is aggressing, i.e. violating the NAP, and (by most rectification theories) should pay compensation. Critics argue that the legal rights approach might allow people who can afford to pay a sufficiently large amount of compensation to get away with murder. They point out that local law may vary from proportional compensation to capital punishment to no compensation at all.

Non-physical aggression 
Other critics state that the NAP is unethical because it does not provide for the violent prohibition of, and thereby supposedly legitimizes, several forms of aggression that do not involve intrusion on property rights such as verbal sexual harassment, defamation, boycotting, noninvasive striking etc. If a victim thus provoked would turn to physical violence, they would be labeled an aggressor according to the NAP. However, supporters of the NAP state that boycotting and defamation both constitute freedoms of speech and that boycotting, noninvasive striking and noninvasive discrimination all constitute freedoms of association and that both freedoms of association and of speech are nonaggressive. Supporters also point out that prohibiting physical retaliation against an action is not itself condonement of said action, and that generally there are other, nonphysical means by which one can combat social ills (e.g., discrimination) that do not violate the NAP. Some supporters also state that while most of the time individuals choose voluntarily to engage in situations that may cause some degree of mental battering, this mental battering begins to constitute unauthorized physical overload of the senses (i.e. eardrum and retina) when it cannot be avoided and that the NAP at that point does apply.

Many supporters consider verbal and written threats of imminent physical violence sufficient justification for a defensive response in a physical manner. Those threats would then constitute a legitimate limit to permissible speech. Because freedom of association entails the right of owners to choose who is permitted to enter or remain on their premises, legitimate property owners may also impose limitation on speech. The owner of a theatre wishing to avoid a stampede may prohibit those on her property from calling 'fire!' without just cause. However, the owner of a bank may not prohibit anyone from urging the general public to a bank run, except insofar as this occurs on the property of said owner.

In a 1948 interview with Donald H. Kirkley for the Library of Congress, H. L. Mencken, a writer who influenced many libertarians, puts an ethical limit on the freedom of speech:

Supporters also consider physical threats of imminent physical violence (e.g. pointing a firearm at innocent people, or stocking up nuclear weapons that cannot be used discriminately against specific individual aggressors) sufficient justification for a defensive response in a physical manner. Those threats would then constitute a legitimate limit to permissible action.

Inconsistency criticisms

Natural resources and environmental pollution 
Critics argue it is not possible to uphold NAP when protecting the environment as most pollution can never be traced back to the party that caused it. They therefore claim that only general broad government regulations will be able to protect the environment. Supporters cite the theoretical "tragedy of the commons" and argue that free-market environmentalism will be much more effective in conserving nature.
Political theorist Hillel Steiner emphasizes that all things made come from natural resources and that the validity of any rights to those made things depends on the validity of the rights to the natural resources. If land was stolen then anyone buying produce from that land would not be the legitimate owner of the goods. Also, if natural resources cannot be privately owned but are, and always will be, the property of all of mankind then NAP would be violated if such a resource would be used without everybody's consent (see the Lockean proviso and free-market anarchism). Libertarian philosopher Roderick Long suggests that, as natural resources are required not only for the production of goods but for the production of the human body as well, the very concept of self-ownership can only exist if the land itself is privately owned.

Relative rather than absolute concept 
Consequentialist libertarian David D. Friedman, who believes that the NAP should be understood as a relative rather than absolute principle, defends his view by using a Sorites argument. Friedman begins by stating what he considers obvious: a neighbor aiming his flashlight at someone's property is not aggression, or if it is, it is only aggression in a trivial technical sense. However, aiming at the same property with a gigawatt laser is certainly aggression by any reasonable definition. Yet both flashlight and laser shine photons onto the property, so there must be some cutoff point of how many photons one is permitted to shine upon a property before it is considered aggression. However, the cutoff point cannot be found by deduction alone because of the Sorites paradox, so the non-aggression principle is necessarily ambiguous. Friedman points out the difficulty of undertaking any activity that poses a certain amount of risk to third parties (e.g. flying) if the permission of thousands of people that might be affected by the activity is required.

See also 

 Ahimsa
 Harm principle
 Law of equal liberty
 Libertarian pledge
 Libertarian theories of law
 Negative liberty
 Nonviolent resistance
 Primum non nocere
 Wiccan Rede
 Pacifism
 Silver Rule
 Taxation is theft
 Victimless crime
 Voluntaryism

Notes

References

External links 
 The Non-Aggression Axiom of Libertarianism by Walter Block at LewRockwell.com.
 The Philosophy of Liberty, an animated production which derives a libertarian philosophy from the principle of self-ownership.  Central to this is the non-aggression principle.
 Antiwar.com, a website devoted to opposing aggressive war, imperialism and assaults on freedom associated with both. The editors describe their political view as libertarian.
 Zero Aggression Project, a website devoted to teaching the concepts of the zero aggression principle with easy to use Heuristics and a project of DownsizeDC.org

Anarcho-capitalism
Ethical principles
Libertarian terms
Libertarianism in the United States
Social concepts